Arbinda (also spelled Aribinda) is a town in and the capital of the Arbinda Department of Soum Province in northern Burkina Faso. The town has a population of 45,818 as of 2019.

History

On 24 December 2019, a group of militants attacked civilians and a military base in Arbinda in one of Burkina Faso's deadliest attacks. At least 122 people were killed, including 35 civilians, 7 soldiers, and 80 attackers.

References

Populated places in the Sahel Region
Soum Province